Cameraria sokoke is a moth of the family Gracillariidae. It is found in coastal forests of eastern Kenya.

The forewings are elongate and the ground colour is light ochreous with white markings consisting of a basal streak and three parallel fasciae. The hindwings are pale greyish with a silvery shine and with a long fringe of slightly darker shading without shine. Adults are on wing in late March.

Etymology
The specific name refers to the type locality.

References

Moths described in 2012
sokoke
Endemic moths of Kenya
Moths of Africa

Taxa named by Jurate de Prins